Surround SCM is a software configuration management application developed by Seapine Software, now owned by Perforce since 2017. Perforce integrated the software with its Helix ALM product.

Architecture
Surround SCM has a client–server architecture. The server manages a central database of file versions and branches. Users work on files on their local hard drive and submit changed files together in changelists. The client and  server communicate via a TCP/IP connection using 512-bit encryption.

Server
Surround SCM stores data in an industry-standard relational database management system. The database contains both the file contents and metadata (file state, file attributes, branching and merging history, changelists, filters, users, groups, labels, etc.). A proxy server can optionally be installed to improve performance of file retrievals for distributed teams.

Clients
There are several different categories of Surround SCM clients: GUI, CLI, API, Web UI, and plugin.

The cross-platform GUI client is developed with Qt and available on Windows, Mac OS X, and Linux. It fully supports all end-user operations and administration operations.

The command line interface (CLI) is also available on Windows, Mac OS X, and Linux. The CLI can be used in any command shell or script. Build scripts generally access Surround SCM files via the CLI.

Surround SCM’s open API allows users to write applications that access branches, repositories, and files on the Surround SCM Server using the C, Java, and .Net programming languages.

The plugin interfaces integrate Surround SCM client functionality into third-party applications. Surround SCM plugins are available for Eclipse, IntelliJ IDEA, KDevelop, Visual Studio, NetBeans, JDeveloper, PowerBuilder, WebStorm, Windows Explorer, Mac OS X Finder, Linux file system, Bugzilla, JIRA, Microsoft TFS, TestTrack, Ant, NAnt, Hudson, Jenkins, TeamCity, CruiseControl, CruiseControl.NET, Dreamweaver, FinalBuilder, Microsoft Office, and QA Wizard.

Release History
Major release versions of Surround SCM, along with their release dates:
 version 1.0 (September 3, 2002)
 version 1.1 (October 1, 2002)
 version 1.2 (January 29, 2003)
 version 1.5 (April 21, 2003)
 version 2.0 (August 26, 2003)
 version 2.1 (December 15, 2003)
 version 3.0 (August 2, 2004)
 version 3.1 (February 7, 2005)
 version 4.0 (July 19, 2005)
 version 4.1 (January 30, 2006)
 version 5.0 (November 2, 2006)
 version 2008.0 (October 9, 2007)
 version 2008.1 (April 21, 2008)
 version 2009.0 (February 5, 2009)
 version 2009.1 (June 30, 2009)
 version 2010.0 (November 16, 2009)
 version 2010.1 (May 3, 2010)
 version 2011.0 (October 21, 2010)
 version 2011.1 (June 1, 2011)
 version 2012.0 (February 9, 2012)
 version 2012.1 (March 9, 2012)
 version 2013.0 (October 22, 2012)
 version 2013.1 (March 20, 2013)
 version 2013.2 (September 12, 2013)
 version 2014.0 (March 14, 2014)
 version 2014.1 (September 5, 2014)
 version 2015.0 (December 17, 2014)
 version 2015.1 (September 8, 2015)
 version 2016.0 (April 11, 2016)
 version 2016.1 (October 6, 2016)
 version 2017.1 (April 24, 2017)
 version 2017.2 (September 18, 2017)
 version 2018.1 (March 5, 2018)
 version 2018.2 (August 30, 2018)
 version 2019.1 (February 11, 2019)
 version 2019.2 (October 15, 2019)
 version 2020.1 (May 26, 2020)
 version 2021.1 (July 28, 2021)

Features
Surround SCM features include:
 Branching and merging
 File and change set labeling
 Graphical file history
 Changelist and atomic transactions
 Filters
 Search file contents
 Shelves
 Configurable workflow
 Email notifications
 Custom fields
 Code review capabilities
 Role-based security groups
 Single sign-on
 Data stored in an RDBMS
 External reports
 Cross-platform GUI and CLI
 Electronic signatures
 Automatic client upgrades
 Proxy server
 Shadow folders

Awards
In 2008 Surround SCM won a Jolt Award in the Change and Configuration Management category.

See also
Comparison of revision control software
List of revision control software

References

External links
Perforce Surround SCM website

Proprietary version control systems
File comparison tools
Configuration management